The Tattooed Lady can refer to:

 Tattooed Lady, a popular type of attraction in the United States in the early 20th century
 "The Tattooed Lady", a 1940s novelty song recorded by The Kingston Trio on the 1960 album String Along
 "The Tattooed Lady", a 1952 novelty song by Skeets McDonald
 "Tattoo'd Lady", a song by Rory Gallagher from the 1973 album Tattoo
 "She Sits Down on Me", a 1940s song written and recorded by The Talbot Brothers of Bermuda, recorded by Benny Bell as "The Tattooed Lady"

See also
 "Lydia the Tattooed Lady", a 1939 song